Ursinoscorpaenopsis is a monotypic genus of marine ray-finned fish belonging to the family Scorpaenidae, the scorpionfishes. Its only species, Ursinoscorpaenopsis kitai, is native to the Pacific Ocean waters around Japan.

The genus name Ursinoscorpaeanopsis refers to its "bearlike shape" and similar to Scorpaenopsis. The specific name honours the collector of the type Tsugiyoshi Kita of Nagasaki.

The genus Ursinoscorpaenopsis differs from other scorpionfish genera by havinga paranuchal spine, a supplemental spine on the last suborbital spine and non-fleshy, branched fin rays in the pectoral fin rays. It also has an orange-reddish body, lacks any teeth on the palatine, has a swimbladder, and possesses a supraneural and 5 unfused hypurals. This genus appears to be one of the more basal genera in the family Scorpaenidae.

References

Scorpaenini
Taxa named by Tetsuji Nakabo
Fish described in 1996
Monotypic marine fish genera
Taxobox binomials not recognized by IUCN